The Norwegian K class submarines are a class of three submarines the Royal Norwegian Navy received from Germany in  1948 as Allied war spoils. They were built as the Type VIIC/41 U-boat from 1940 to 1945. Kaura was returned to Germany in 1971 as a museum ship. It is the only surviving Type VII in the world.

Description 
The German type VIIC/41 was a slightly modified version of the successful VIIC and had the same armament and engines.  The difference was a stronger pressure hull and lighter machinery to compensate for the added steel in the hull, making them actually slightly lighter than the VIIC.  A total of 91 were built.

Bibliography

Submarine classes